The 1969–70 daytime network television schedule for the three major English-language commercial broadcast networks in the United States covers the weekday and weekend daytime hours from September 1969 to August 1970.

Legend

 New series are highlighted in bold.

Schedule
 All times correspond to U.S. Eastern and Pacific Time scheduling (except for some live sports or events). Except where affiliates slot certain programs outside their network-dictated timeslots, subtract one hour for Central, Mountain, Alaska, and Hawaii-Aleutian times.
 Local schedules may differ, as affiliates have the option to pre-empt or delay network programs. Such scheduling may be limited to preemptions caused by local or national breaking news or weather coverage (which may force stations to tape delay certain programs to other timeslots) and any major sports events scheduled to air in a weekday timeslot (mainly during major holidays). Stations may air shows at other times at their preference.
ABC had a 6PM (ET)/5PM (CT) feed for their newscast, depending on stations' schedule.

Monday-Friday

Saturday

Sunday

By network

ABC

Returning series
ABC News
The Adventures of Gulliver
Bewitched 
The Bullwinkle Show
Dark Shadows
The Dating Game
Discovery
Dream House
The Dudley Do-Right Show
Fantastic Four
Fantastic Voyage
General Hospital
George of the Jungle
Happening
Issues and Answers
Let's Make a Deal
The New American Bandstand 1970
The New Casper Cartoon Show
The Newlywed Game
One Life to Live
Spider-Man
That Girl 

New series
A World Apart
All My Children
The Best of Everything
The Cattanooga Cats Show
Get It Together
The Hardy Boys
Hot Wheels
Skyhawks
The Smokey Bear Show

Not returning from 1968–69
The Children's Doctor
The Dick Cavett Show
Funny You Should Ask
Journey to the Center of the Earth
The King Kong Show 
Linus the Lionhearted 
The New Beatles 
Treasure Isle

CBS

Returning series
The Adventures of Batman
The Andy Griffith Show 
As the World Turns
The Beverly Hillbillies 
The Bugs Bunny/Road Runner Hour
Camera Three
Captain Kangaroo
CBS Evening News
CBS Morning News
CBS News
The Edge of Night
Face the Nation
The Guiding Light
The Jetsons 
Jonny Quest 
Lamp Unto My Feet
Look Up and Live
Love Is a Many Splendored Thing
Love of Life
The Lucy Show 
The Monkees 
The New Adventures of Superman
Search for Tomorrow
The Secret Storm
Sunrise Semester
Ted Mack's Amateur Hour
Tom and Jerry 
Wacky Races

New series
Dastardly and Muttley in Their Flying Machines
Gomer Pyle, USMC 
The Perils of Penelope Pitstop
Scooby Doo, Where Are You?
Where the Heart Is

Not returning from 1968–69
Aquaman
The Archie Show
The Batman/Superman Hour
The Dick Van Dyke Show 
The Go Go Gophers Show
The Herculoids 
The Linkletter Show
The Lone Ranger
Moby Dick and the Mighty Mightor
Shazzan

NBC

Returning series
Another World
Another World in Bay City
The Banana Splits Adventure Hour
Concentration
Days of Our Lives
The Doctors
The Flintstones 
Frontiers of Faith
The Heckle and Jeckle Cartoon Show
Hollywood Squares
It Takes Two
Jeopardy!
Meet the Press
NBC Saturday Night News
NBC Sunday Night News
Today
You're Putting Me On

New series
Another World in Somerset
Bright Promise
Dinah's Place
Here Comes the Grump
H.R. Pufnstuf
The Huntley-Brinkley Report
Jambo
Letters to Laugh-In
Life with Linkletter
Lohman and Barkley's Name Droppers
NBC Nightly News
The Pink Panther Show
Sale of the Century
The Who, What, or Where Game

Not returning from 1968–69
Birdman and the Galaxy Trio
Cool McCool
Eye Guess
Hidden Faces
The Match Game 
Personality
Snap Judgment
Storybook Squares
Super President
The Super 6
Top Cat 
The Untamed World
You Don't Say!

See also
1969-70 United States network television schedule (prime-time)
1969-70 United States network television schedule (late night)

References
Castleman & Podrazik, The TV Schedule Book, McGraw-Hill Paperbacks, 1984

United States weekday network television schedules
1969 in American television
1970 in American television